Kongoussi  is a department or commune of Bam Province in north-western Burkina Faso. Its capital is the town of Kongoussi. According to the 2019 census the department has a total population of 121,585.

Towns and villages
Kongoussi
Badinogo (number 1)
Badinogo (number 2)
Birou 
Boalin
Bogonam
Bogonam-Foulbé 
Daribiti (number 1) 
Daribiti (number 2)
Darigma
Dinguilga
Imieré 
Gonsé
Kiella
Kora
Kora-Foulbé
Kondibito
Kougrisséogo
Kouka
Koumbango
Kourpellé 
Loagha
Loagha-Foulbé 
Lourgou 
Mogodin 
Nakindougou 
Niénéga-Mossi 
Niénéga-Foulbé
Nongsom 
Nongsom-Foulbé
Ranga
Rambo-Wottionma
Rissiam 
Sam
Sakou
Sakou-Foulbé
Sandouré 
Sankondé
Sargo
Senopoguian
Senorsingué
Sorgho-Yargo
Tamponga
Tangaye
Tanguiema
Temnaoré 
Temnaoré-Foulbé 
Touka
Woussé 
Yalga 
Yalgo
Yalka
Yougounini 
Zingguima
Zoura
Zoura-Foulbé

References

Departments of Burkina Faso
Bam Province

it:Kongoussi
vi:Kongoussi